The badminton tournaments at the 2013 Mediterranean Games in Mersin took place between 25 June and 30 June at the Mersin University Hall. This was the first time that badminton events held at the Mediterranean Games.

Athletes competed in four events: men's singles, women's singles, men's doubles and women's doubles.

Medal table

Medal summary

Medalists

References
mersin2013.gov.tr

Sports at the 2013 Mediterranean Games
Badminton at the Mediterranean Games
Mediterranean Games
Badminton tournaments in Turkey